Zheng Bofan (born 2 March 1995), formerly known as Zheng Zixiang, is a Chinese footballer currently playing as a midfielder for Beijing BSU, on loan from Dalian Pro.

Career statistics

Club
.

References

1995 births
Living people
Chinese footballers
China youth international footballers
Association football midfielders
Campeonato de Portugal (league) players
Second Professional Football League (Bulgaria) players
China League One players
F.C. Felgueiras 1932 players
F.C. Oliveira do Hospital players
Shandong Taishan F.C. players
Dalian Professional F.C. players
Kunshan F.C. players
Beijing Sport University F.C. players
Chinese expatriate footballers
Chinese expatriate sportspeople in Portugal
Expatriate footballers in Portugal
Expatriate footballers in Bulgaria